Colchester School District can refer to:
Chignecto-Central Regional School Board, formerly the Colchester-East Hants Amalgamated School Board
Colchester School District (Connecticut)
Colchester School District (Vermont)